Relcovaptan (SR-49059) is a non-peptide vasopressin receptor antagonist, selective for the V1a subtype. It has shown positive initial results for the treatment of Raynaud's disease and dysmenorrhoea, and as a tocolytic, although it is not yet approved for clinical use.

References 

Vasopressin receptor antagonists